Avalon Beach is a northern beachside suburb of Sydney, in the state of New South Wales, Australia. It is 37 kilometres north of the Sydney central business district, in the local government area of Northern Beaches Council, in the Northern Beaches region.  The area was previously called Avalon, with the name Avalon Beach being assigned during a change in boundaries and names in the Pittwater region in 2012.

History 
The Pittwater and Northern Beaches area was formerly inhabited by the Garigal or Caregal people in a region known as Guringai country.

European settlement 
Avalon was named after the mythical Avalon, a legendary island in Celtic languages mythology. According to legends, Avalon was an earthly paradise and the final resting place of King Arthur.

In 1833 a  land grant was made to Australia's first Catholic priest, John Joseph Therry, by Governor Bourke. A further grant of 280 acres made in 1837 meant that Therry's holdings covered most of the peninsula from Newport to Whale Beach. He built a church in this area but his plans for a settlement never eventuated. Therry fought hard for the recognition of the Catholic Church in the colony. After he died, the land was left to the Jesuit order and was then sold to help finance the rebuilding of St. Mary's Cathedral in Sydney. In the 1920s, the area was still known as 'Priest's Flat'. Arthur J Small handled a subdivision in 1921 and chose the name Avalon. Lots were sold for £100 each and included two year's free membership in the local golf club.

Significant housing developments took place during the 1920s. The architect Alexander Stewart Jolly designed a number of houses that were built in the Avalon area in that period. Loggan Rock was a flamboyant log cabin combined with a stone tower; the combination of logs and rocks gave rise to the name. The house is heritage-listed. Careel House is a bungalow made of stone that was quarried in the area. Nowadays it is on the Whale Beach side of the boundary. It is also heritage-listed. Hy Brasil, located near Clareville, was built in 1936, but was originally known as The Gem. Later it was bought by Ted Herman, son of the painter Sali Herman, who changed the name, using the name of a mythical island west of Ireland. It is heritage-listed. A sandstone cottage known as Wickham, designed by Walter Burley Griffin, was unfortunately demolished with council approval in 1994.

Another significant development was the creation of Ruskin Rowe in 1950. This street was designed as an estate by the architect Harry Ruskin Rowe, son of the architect Thomas Rowe. Rowe created covenants to preserve the character of the estate, but they have been ignored to an extent over the years. Nevertheless, the estate is heritage-listed because of its historic significance, as well as its scientific significance in preserving the bushland environment of the area.

Early subdivision plans

Heritage listings
Avalon Beach has a number of heritage-listed sites, including:
 32 Plateau Road: Walter Burley Griffin Lodge
 111 Whale Beach Road: Loggan Rock

Demographics
According to the 2016 census of population, there were 9,905 residents in Avalon Beach.  73.3% of people were born in Australia. The next most common countries of birth were England 9.6%, New Zealand 2.0% and United States of America 1.1%. 90.2% of people only spoke English at home. The most common responses for religious affiliation were No Religion 43.0%, Catholic 19.4% and Anglican 18.6%.

Commercial areas 
Avalon Beach features an RSL club, a surf club, bowling and sailing clubs; a golf club, a supermarket, shops, offices, cafes and a cinema. Cuisines include French, Vietnamese, Italian, Mexican, American Diner, Japanese, Thai and other Asian. There is a book shop, hairdresser, artisan bakery, petrol station, Red Cross Shop, bottle shop, many real estate agents, hardware store, florists and many homewares and dress shops. It is unique in that this large commercial centre is separated from the beach only by the road, a fact which until recently was used to argue against commercialisation of the beach side buildings themselves as restaurants and cafes were already so close to the beach.

Sport and recreation 
Avalon Beach is a surfing beach and has a 25-metre salt water rock pool at the south end. It is renowned for its rich orange-coloured sand (that indicate the presence of iron oxide), which contrasts to the typical yellow coloured beaches in the eastern suburbs. Avalon Beach SLSC members patrol Avalon Beach. Several former surfing world champions are also past or current Avalon residents, including Ben Player.

Avalon Soccer Club, established 1982, has over 80 teams and 1000 registered players. Avalon Junior Rugby League Club has contributed several players active in the Australian National Rugby League. Avalon also has a small nine-hole golf course.

The former Pittwater Council created the Bangalley Headland Bicentennical Walk, which goes through part of the Careel Headland Reserve. The track starts at Whale Beach Road and goes to Marine Parade. The council also proposed a Plan of Management for the Bicentennial Walk in 2001, and adopted it in 2002. St Michaels Cave is an interesting coastal feature.

Schools 
 Barrenjoey High School
 Avalon Public School
 Maria Regina Catholic Primary School
 Montessori public school on the former grounds of Barrenjoey Highschool

Culture/politics 
An episode of the American television show Baywatch was shot at Avalon Beach in the late 1990s. Producers of the show, seeking to relocate from their Californian base due to cost constraints, proposed a full relocation to Avalon and promised an upgrading of the SLSC in return, painting a huge sign saying "Avalon Beach" across the surf club. However, following complaints from residents (supported by former world surfing champion and local property owner Mark Warren), the series moved instead to Hawaii. The anti-Baywatch supporters were led by former Pittwater mayor Alex McTaggart, who was subsequently elected to NSW State Parliament for two years.

In 2011-13 there was a move by the Avalon Beach Surf Life Saving club officials, led by Christine Hopton, to replace the existing surf club. The development went ahead despite opposition from local residents in the land and environment court.

Australian drama series Blue Water High was set at Avalon Beach, and the series was filmed there.

Gallery

Notable residents 
 Yahoo Serious (1953-), actor and director
 Mandy Zieren (1978-), competitive bodyboarder

References 

 
Suburbs of Sydney
Beaches of Sydney
Surfing locations in New South Wales
Northern Beaches Council